Benjamin Perrin is a professor at the Peter A. Allard School of Law at the University of British Columbia. He lives in Vancouver, British Columbia, Canada.

Human trafficking opponent
Perrin is involved with human trafficking research and activism, and wrote the 2010 book Invisible Chains: Canada's Underground World of Human Trafficking. This book deals extensively with a gang of pimps called North Preston's Finest and includes an account of the disappearance of Jessie Foster. Perrin received a George Ryga Award for Social Awareness in Literature nomination for having written this book. Perrin helped Joy Smith develop the National Action Plan to Combat Human Trafficking. In the 2009 Trafficking in Persons (TIP) Report by the United States Department of State's Office to Monitor and Combat Trafficking in Persons, he was the only Canadian named a TIP Hero.  Perrin spoke at the news conference at the Vancouver American consulate during which the TIP report was released, and he called for Stephen Harper "to announce that he will enact a national action plan to combat human trafficking to follow up on the measures that his government has already taken." Perrin said that not having such a plan in place makes Canada look bad internationally and also prevents the issue of human trafficking from being adequately addressed. Perrin argued that, if the plan was to be effective, it needed to establish a strategy for preventing human trafficking, protecting victims, and prosecuting traffickers. He further said that the establishment of a national action plan on this issue "should be a priority for our federal government to end this atrocious crime that is flourishing in Canada."

Political career

He moved to Ottawa, Ontario in the late 1990s in order to become a policy intern for the Reform Party of Canada.

He eventually was appointed "Special Adviser and Legal Counsel to the Prime Minister", and acted as a lead policy adviser in the PMO on subjects of relevance to the Department of Citizenship and Immigration, the Department of Justice, and Public Safety Canada.

In 2013, Perrin was implicated in the Canadian Senate expenses scandal. Perrin was named in an "Information to Obtain" police request related to the scandal.  In a letter to the RCMP's assistant commissioner Gilles Michaud, the PCO said it had informed the Prime Minister's Office that emails from Perrin, who allegedly helped broker a deal between Nigel Wright and Sen. Mike Duffy were not deleted, as had mistakenly been believed, following Perrin's abrupt departure from the PMO in March 2013.  The PCO letter states the account was not deleted, as is standard practice, but in fact frozen due to unrelated litigation. In April 2013, Perrin left the Office of the Prime Minister and took up a position on the Faculty of Law at UBC. On 30 July 2014, the Law Society of British Columbia announced that it closed its file related to Perrin's alleged role in the affair because the complaint was not valid. On 25 October 2014, the Law Society of Upper Canada also reported that after fully investigating, it had no concerns whatsoever with Perrin's conduct as a lawyer.

References

Living people
Canadian crime writers
21st-century Canadian non-fiction writers
Organized crime writers
Writers from Vancouver
Sexual abuse victim advocates
Human trafficking in Canada
Academic staff of the University of British Columbia
Canadian legal scholars
Advisors
Canadian criminologists
Scholars of criminal law
Sex industry researchers
Canadian legal writers
Year of birth missing (living people)
Lawyers in British Columbia